Briar Hill may refer to the following places:

 Briar Hill, Victoria, Australia
 Hounsfield Heights/Briar Hill, Calgary, Alberta, Canada
 Briar Hill, Michigan, ghost town
 Briar Hill (Michigan), the highest point in the Lower Peninsula of Michigan, U.S.
 Briar Hill, Northamptonshire, England
 Briar Hill–Belgravia, Fairbank, Toronto, Canada

See also
 Brier Hill (disambiguation)
 Briarhills, Houston, Texas, U.S.